Barbara Bronisława Baran-Wojnar (born 1 September 1959) is a Polish athlete. She competed in the women's long jump at the 1980 Summer Olympics.

References

1959 births
Living people
Athletes (track and field) at the 1980 Summer Olympics
Polish female long jumpers
Olympic athletes of Poland
People from Łańcut